The following is a timeline of the COVID-19 pandemic in Singapore in 2023.

January

 4 January: Eligible individuals of all age groups can walk into any vaccination centre without booking an appointment.
 9 January: In the wake of China's reopening, Health Minister Ong Ye Kung announced that travelers from China to Singapore would not be required to undergo pre-departure COVID-19 testing.
 16 January:  The Pfizer-BioNTech/Comirnaty vaccine will be available to children aged six months to four years.

February

 9 February:
 MOH announced that from 13 February, the DORSCON level would be lowered to Green; mask-wearing would no longer be mandatory on public transport and some healthcare and residential care settings (but would still be required for hospital wards, clinics and nursing homes). The Multi-ministry Task Force (MTF) would also be stood down.
 MOH announced that all COVID-19 border restrictions would be lifted from 13 February onwards.
 It was announced that from 1 March, COVID-19 guidelines for worker dormitories would be recalibrated to align with those for the community.
 Users of TraceTogether may uninstall the app and return any physical tokens from 13 February onwards, with community centers ceasing issuing of tokens. The use of SafeEntry by businesses will also cease.

References 

2023 in Singapore
Health in Singapore
Disease outbreaks in Singapore
2023